{{DISPLAYTITLE:Columbus External Payload Facility}}

The 'Columbus External Payload Facility (Columbus-EPF') is a component of the Columbus module on the International Space Station. It consists of two identical L-shaped consoles attached to the starboard cone of Columbus in the zenith (top) and nadir (bottom) positions, each supporting two platforms for external payloads or payload facilities. Four external payloads (payload facilities) can be operated at the same time.

 History 
Columbus-EPF was transported to the International Space Station (ISS) with the Columbus module on STS-122/1E in February 2008. Columbus-EPF payloads and payload facilities are transported to and from orbit using a carrier supplied by the ISS Program. The payloads and payload facilities are manoeuvred by the robotic manipulators of the ISS to their final operational locations on the Columbus-EPF.  Each payload or payload facility has an open view to ram and to starboard, as well as one to either zenith or nadir. The view in the wake direction is reduced by ISS structures. At the end of its operational phase, a payload is transported to the carrier by robotic means and returned to ground for post-mission inspection and analysis and, possibly, refurbishment.

The first Columbus-EPF payload facilities were the European Technology Exposure Facility (EuTEF) and Sun Monitoring on the External Payload Facility of Columbus (Solar), which were installed during an extravehicular activity (EVA) by crew members of the STS 122 mission .

Functions
In addition to structural support, Columbus can supply power and data (command) to the Columbus-EPF payloads and can poll the payloads for housekeeping (health and status) and user data. The power and data interfaces available to the Columbus-EPF payloads are directly connected to the Columbus internal distribution systems. Columbus-EPF payloads and payload facilities are controlled and commanded via Columbus using the same data links and ground segment infrastructure used for internal payloads. Each payload has a facility-responsible centre that can transmit commands and receive telemetry via the Columbus Control Centre. Columbus provides a maximum of 1.25 kW per Columbus-EPF location. Each Columbus-EPF location is connected to two 120-Vdc power feeders, each of which has a maximum allocation of 1.25 kW. Switching between the power feeders is done via the payload power switch box in Columbus and requires the power feeders to be powered down.

The maximum on-orbit mass of an external Columbus-EPF payload, including the adapter plate, is 290 kg. The dimensions of a payload should not exceed 864 x 1168 x 1245 mm without the adapter plate.

Bartolomeo
The Bartolomeo platform was robotically removed from SpaceX CRS-20's trunk and installed on the external forward side of Columbus module in April 2020, attached to the trunnions that held Columbus in the payload bay of Space Shuttle Atlantis on its 2008 launch.  An EVA for ISS astronauts to connect power and communications cables and to install a new Ka-band antenna was carried out on January 27, 2021. Due to issues with the installation of Bartolomeo, only four out of the six cables could be installed. The platform is "partially operational and in a safe configuration" according to NASA; the final two cables will be installed on a future spacewalk. ESA is emphasizing its usefulness for commercial entities, academic institutions, and other lower-budget customers.

Airbus spent about €40 million to develop the Bartolomeo platform, according to DLR, the German space agency. DLR says accommodations on Bartolomeo will be priced from €300,000 to €3.5 million per year. Data from attached experiments will be routed to the ground through the space station's telemetry system, then go into cloud storage, where scientists can access the information with a smartphone. Payload owners can also send commands to their experiments through a smartphone. A German-made laser communications terminal will be added to Bartolomeo in 2021, allowing faster data links between experiments and their operators on the ground. Airbus is also partnering with the United Nations Office for Outer Space Affairs to solicit ideas for Bartolomeo payloads from around the world. Developing countries in particular are encouraged to participate.

 External experiments on Columbus 
Payloads are installed onto Columbus'' using Flight Releasable Attachment Mechanisms or FRAMs for short. There are four FRAMs on Columbus; each is currently holding an external payload.

Current 
 FRAM 1 (top side): Empty, awaiting Atomic Clock Ensemble in Space 
 FRAM 2 (side top pylon): Empty, awaiting EXPORT 
 FRAM 3 (side bottom pylon): Atmosphere-Space Interaction Monitor (ASIM)  
 FRAM 4 (bottom side): STP-H7 (End of mission will be disposed on Cygnus 18 and replaced by STP-H10 on SpaceX CRS-29).

Deorbited
 LWAPA/MISSE 6     
 EuTEF    
 ISS-RapidScat
 SOLAR
 Space Debris Sensor (SDS)
 High Definition Earth Viewing cameras (HDEV)

Awaiting launch 
 Atomic Clock Ensemble in Space
 EXPORT
 GEROS

Related publications
 Persson J, Dettmann J. Columbus External Payload Facility - Architecture and Utilisation. Conference and Exhibit on International Space Station Utilization, Cape Canaveral, FL. Oct 15 - 18, ;AIAA-2001-5068. 2001

See also
 Scientific research on the ISS

References

Science facilities on the International Space Station
Columbus (ISS module)